SageMath (previously Sage or SAGE, "System for Algebra and Geometry Experimentation") is a computer algebra system (CAS) with features covering many aspects of mathematics, including algebra, combinatorics, graph theory, numerical analysis, number theory, calculus and statistics.

The first version of SageMath was released on 24 February 2005 as free and open-source software under the terms of the GNU General Public License version 2, with the initial goals of creating an "open source alternative to Magma, Maple, Mathematica, and MATLAB". The originator and leader of the SageMath project, William Stein, was a mathematician at the University of Washington.

SageMath uses a syntax resembling Python's, supporting procedural, functional and object-oriented constructs.

Development

Stein realized when designing Sage that there were many open-source mathematics software packages already written in different languages, namely C, C++, Common Lisp, Fortran and Python.

Rather than reinventing the wheel, Sage (which is written mostly in Python and Cython) integrates many specialized CAS software packages into a common interface, for which a user needs to know only Python. However, Sage contains hundreds of thousands of unique lines of code adding new functions and creating the interfaces among its components.

SageMath uses both students and professionals for development. The development of SageMath is supported by both volunteer work and grants. However, it was not until 2016 that the first full-time Sage developer was hired (funded by an EU grant). The same year, Stein described his disappointment with a lack of academic funding and credentials for software development, citing it as the reason for his decision to leave his tenured academic position to work full-time on the project in a newly founded company, SageMath, Inc.

Achievements
 2007: first prize in the scientific software division of Les Trophées du Libre, an international competition for free software.
 2012: one of the projects selected for the Google Summer of Code.
 2013: ACM/SIGSAM Jenks Prize.

Performance
Both binaries and source code are available for SageMath from the download page. If SageMath is built from source code, many of the included libraries such as OpenBLAS,  FLINT, GAP (computer algebra system), and NTL will be tuned and optimized for that computer, taking into account the number of processors, the size of their caches, whether there is hardware support for SSE instructions, etc.

Cython can increase the speed of SageMath programs, as the Python code is converted into C.

Licensing and availability
SageMath is free software, distributed under the terms of the GNU General Public License version 3.

Although Microsoft was sponsoring a native version of SageMath for the Windows operating system, prior to 2016 there were no plans for a native port, and users of Windows had to use virtualization technology such as VirtualBox to run SageMath. As of SageMath 8.0 (July 2017), with development funded by the OpenDreamKit project, it successfully builds on Cygwin, and a binary installer for 64-bit versions of Windows is available.

Linux distributions in which SageMath is available as a package are Fedora, Arch Linux, Debian, Ubuntu and NixOS. In Gentoo, it is available via layman in the "sage-on-gentoo" overlay. The package used by NixOS is available for use on other distributions, due to the distribution-agnostic nature of its package manager, Nix.

Gentoo prefix also provides Sage on other operating systems.

Software packages contained in SageMath
The philosophy of SageMath is to use existing open-source libraries wherever they exist. Therefore, it uses many libraries from other projects.

See also

 CoCalc
 Comparison of numerical-analysis software
 Comparison of statistical packages
 List of computer algebra systems

References

External links

 

Computer algebra system software for Linux
Computer algebra system software for macOS
Computer algebra system software for Windows
Free and open-source Android software
Free computer algebra systems
Free educational software
Free mathematics software
Free software programmed in Python
Mathematical software
Python (programming language) scientific libraries